Hanford is a village and civil parish in the administrative area North Dorset, in the English county Dorset. The parish had 154 inhabitants in 2001.

References 

Populated places in Dorset
Civil parishes in Dorset
North Dorset District